Kar's Nuts is an American manufacturer of nut and snack items that are distributed nationally in the United States. The company is headquartered in Madison Heights, Michigan. Kar's Nuts, originally located in Detroit, was incorporated in 1939 from a business that had been distributing nut and snack items throughout Michigan since 1933. After World War II, the company moved to Ferndale, Michigan and soon began distributing their products nationwide. In 2004, the company moved back to Madison Heights. Sales are estimated between $100 and $250 million. Kar's business is divided into four market segments that include route sales and delivery to retail outlets in Michigan, Indiana and Ohio, vending machine products, specialty markets and Club Store segment. Kar's products are packaged in single serve, family and super sizes depending on the market segment.

Kar's Nuts and its sister brands Second Nature Snacks and Sanders Chocolates were gathered under the corporate name Second Nature Brands in 2021, after previously having been under the Kar's Nuts banner.

in April 2022, Second Nature Brands were acquired by the UK-based private equity company, CapVest Limited.

References

External links 

Official website of Kar's Nuts
Official website of Second Nature Brands

American brands
American companies established in 1939
Manufacturing companies established in 1939
Manufacturing companies based in Michigan
Privately held companies based in Michigan
Food and drink companies based in Michigan
Companies based in Oakland County, Michigan